Ceratophrys is a genus of frogs in the family Ceratophryidae. They are also known as South American horned frogs as well as Pacman frogs due to their characteristic round shape and large mouth, reminiscent of the video game character Pac-Man.

Species
There are eight species:

Sex differentiation
The female frog will typically not "chirp" or "croak" as often as males, but does sometimes. Males frequently have spotted chests, and at about a year old the males develop spots on their "pads" or "fingers." Males will also sometimes have subtle pads on their front legs during mating season, as well as making a sound similar to a cicada to call to their mates.
The female frog is also generally larger than the male frog.

Care in captivity
In captivity, C. cranwelli, C. ornata and C. cornuta are the most popular species, along with the "fantasy frog", a captive-produced hybrid between C. cranwelli and C. cornuta. These frogs can live in a 10-gallon aquarium for their entire lives.  They thrive best with a shallow bowl of water, loose moist substrate (like coco coir), and hiding places.  They will commonly cover themselves with substrate or just sit contentedly in the water.  These frogs should be misted daily to ensure proper humidity. Temperatures should be maintained between 75° and 80° Fahrenheit (24° to 27° Celsius) during the day, dropping a few degrees at night. They can be fed crickets, earthworms, silkworms, phoenix worms, butterworms, and occasionally guppies, mice, and waxworms. Mealworms and superworms should not be fed to them, due to their hard chitinous shell.

Lifespan
The average lifespan of a Ceratophrys frog in the wild varies between 1 and 4 years, though in captivity and as pets, depending on diet and care, they may live 6 to 10 years and even longer.

Diet
They are voracious eaters, often eating insects, small mammals (such as mice), fish, other frogs, and small reptiles. A fully grown female Argentine Horned Frog (females are generally larger than males) can easily eat a grown rat.

These frogs are also known to be cannibalistic, and have been known to eat their mates, even if they are larger than they are.  It is advisable to isolate multiple frogs.

Although these frogs can swallow animals almost half their size, they sometimes attempt to eat things larger than they are. Their teeth, as well as bony projections in the front of the jaw, can make it difficult for them to release prey after taking it in their mouth, in some cases leading to death by choking.

They have a very sticky tongue which they use to catch prey and pull it into their jaws.

Large individuals have bite forces comparable to those of mammalian predators.

Gallery

References

 
Ceratophryidae
Amphibians of South America